Sebasco Estates is an unincorporated village in the town of Phippsburg, Sagadahoc County, Maine, United States. Sebasco Estates has a post office with ZIP code 04565.

References

Villages in Sagadahoc County, Maine
Villages in Maine